Stevensia may refer to:
 Stevensia (beetle), a genus of beetles in the family Staphylinidae
 Stevensia (plant), a genus of plants in the family Rubiaceae